Priyanka Purohit (born 7 October 1991) is an Indian television actress known for participating in Splitsvilla 7 and portraying Poorva Deshmukh in Krishnadasi.

Career
Purohit started off her career in 2014 by participating in MTV India's Splitsvilla 7. In the same year, she made her acting debut as Gauri in Sony Pal's Yeh Dil Sun Raha Hai.

In 2015, she played Pinky in Zee TV's Bandhan and Pallavi in Life OK's Kalash. In 2016, Purohit portrayed Poorva Deshmukh in Colors TV's Krishnadasi opposite Shravan Reddy.

In 2017, she joined Zee TV's Sanyukt as Hetal Shah opposite Suraj Kakkar. From 2017 to 2018, she portrayed Chandni Kanojia in &TV's Half Marriage opposite Tarun Mahilani.

From 2018 to 2019, Purohit portrayed Bhumi in Zee TV's Aap Ke Aa Jane Se opposite Karan Jotwani. From 2019 to 2020, she played Tara Kohli in SAB TV's Tera Kya Hoga Alia opposite Harshad Arora. In 2021, she starred as Vaidehi in Voot's Sumer Singh Case Files: Girlfriends with Rannvijay Singha, Karishma Sharma and Ayaz Ahmed.

Filmography

Television

Web

Awards and nominations

References

External links

1991 births
Living people